Nicola Jane Campbell (born 1985) is an alpine skier from New Zealand.

In the 2006 Winter Olympics at Turin. She came 35th out of 64 in the Slalom.

References

External links  
 
 

Living people
1985 births
New Zealand female alpine skiers
Olympic alpine skiers of New Zealand
Alpine skiers at the 2006 Winter Olympics
21st-century New Zealand women